Ludmila Richterová (born 7 March 1977) is a Czech former tennis player. She reached her highest ranking, World No. 62, on 18 March 1996, and won one WTA Tour title, the 1995 Rover British Clay Court Championships in Bournemouth, England, by beating Patricia Hy-Boulais 6(10)–7, 6–4, 6–3. In her career, Richterová defeated players such as Barbara Schett, Alexandra Fusai, Chanda Rubin, Conchita Martínez, Anna Smashnova, Ruxandra Dragomir, Anabel Medina Garrigues and Flavia Pennetta.

WTA career finals

Singles Finals (1–1)

ITF Finals

Singles (7-0)

Doubles (4–4)

References

External links 
 
 
 

1977 births
Czech female tennis players
Living people
Australian Open (tennis) junior champions
Grand Slam (tennis) champions in girls' doubles
Sportspeople from Košice
20th-century Czech women